Carál Ní Chuilín  (born 18 December 1964), formerly known as Caroline Cullen, is an Irish Sinn Féin politician and former Provisional IRA member. She has been a member of the Northern Ireland Assembly for Belfast North since 2007 and served in the Northern Ireland Executive as Minister of Culture, Arts and Leisure until 2016. On 15 June 2020, she was appointed Minister for Communities on a temporary basis, due to the health of the previous minister, Deirdre Hargey.

Personal life

Ní Chuilín was born and raised in the New Lodge area of Belfast. She graduated from the Open University in 1994 with a BSc in Social Studies after completing a degree which she began whilst in prison. She later received a master's degree in Management from Queen's University Belfast.

Republican activity

Ní Chuilín was an active volunteer in the IRA. In 1989, she was arrested after trying to place a booby-trap bomb under the gates of Crumlin Royal Ulster Constabulary station. At Belfast Crown Court the following year, she was convicted of firearm possession, possession of explosives with the intent to endanger life, and attempted murder. Ní Chuilín was sentenced to eight years in prison, but she was released after four years. She worked for ten years as coordinator of Tar Anall, a project for republican ex-prisoners.

In 1999, Ní Chuilín was one of two founding directors of Coiste na nIarchimí, a company described as "the umbrella organisation for republican ex-prisoner self-help groups throughout Ireland". The company was struck off in 2011 after failing to provide accounts, and Ní Chuilín resigned her position.

Ní Chuilín has been active with Sinn Féin since her release from prison and represented the Oldpark electoral area on Belfast City Council from 2005 to 2007, when she was replaced by Conor Maskey following her election to the Northern Ireland Assembly.

Assembly

Ní Chuilín was elected in 2007 to the Northern Ireland Assembly as a Sinn Féin member for North Belfast. Re-elected in 2011, she was on 17 May 2011 elected by the Assembly under the D'Hondt method as Minister of Culture, Arts and Leisure.

In this capacity Ní Chuilín became the first senior Sinn Féin representative to attend an association football match involving the Northern Ireland team, when it defeated the Faroe Islands at Windsor Park on 10 August 2011, but she did not attend until after the playing of the Northern Ireland Anthem of "God Save The Queen", and she commended "the very real efforts that have been made by the IFA to tackle sectarianism at their matches".

In September 2011 Ní Chulín's Department launched Líofa 2015, a project aimed at encouraging people in Northern Ireland to learn, teach and speak Irish. Among those taking up the challenge to achieve conversational fluency by 2015 was Judith Gillespie, Deputy Chief Constable of the Police Service of Northern Ireland, and some 1509 other PSNI officers.

In August 2012 Ní Chuilín revealed a £3m investment programme to improve facilities for boxing in Northern Ireland, saying "Over £3m will be invested through Sport NI; it's an initial investment, but it is to make sure that boxing clubs have the facilities that are fit for purpose, because at the minute many of them don't."

In 2011 former IRA prisoner Mary McArdle was appointed Special Adviser to Ní Chuilín. This appointment prompted much public controversy, as McArdle had been convicted of involvement in the murder of Mary Travers and the attempted murder of her father Tom Travers. Ann Travers, sister of Mary, spoke to the press of her anger at the appointment, and repeatedly demanded that McArdle resign. McArdle was later moved from the post, and in June 2013 the Northern Ireland Assembly passed a bill to bar anyone with a serious conviction from being a special political adviser.

References

1964 births
Alumni of the Open University
Female members of the Northern Ireland Assembly
Irish republicans
Irish republicans imprisoned under Prevention of Terrorism Acts
Irish language activists
Living people
Members of Belfast City Council
Ministers of the Northern Ireland Executive (since 1999)
Northern Ireland MLAs 2007–2011
Northern Ireland MLAs 2011–2016
Northern Ireland MLAs 2016–2017
Northern Ireland MLAs 2017–2022
Politicians from Belfast
Provisional Irish Republican Army members
Sinn Féin MLAs
Women ministers of the Northern Ireland Executive
Sinn Féin councillors in Northern Ireland
Women councillors in Northern Ireland
Northern Ireland MLAs 2022–2027